Dolores Gresham (born July 16, 1942) is a Republican politician from Tennessee. She was elected to the Tennessee Senate in the 2008 elections after having served three terms in the Tennessee House of Representatives. Senate District 26 encompassed the counties of Chester, Crockett, Fayette, Hardeman, Hardin, Haywood, McNairy and Wayne in the western part of the state.

Education
Gresham holds a Bachelor of Arts from University of the Incarnate Word, Master of Arts from Loyola University New Orleans and a Master of Science in administration from The George Washington University. She served in the United States Marine Corps, retiring with the rank of lieutenant colonel.

Political career
In 2002, Gresham was elected to the Tennessee House of Representatives from District 94, which includes all of her home county of Fayette as well as parts of Tipton and Hardeman. She was re-elected in 2004 and 2006. During her time in the House, Gresham served on the Agriculture and Education Committees.

In 2008, she vacated her House seat to run for the Senate seat of John S. Wilder, the former lieutenant governor, who was retiring after 42 years in the Senate. She faced the Democrat Randy Camp, a former aide to Governor Phil Bredesen. The seat was considered one of the most competitive as both parties sought to end a 16–16–1 stalemate in the Senate. Gresham defeated Camp 54%–46%, as the Republicans took control of both houses of the Tennessee General Assembly for the first time since Reconstruction.

Personal life
Gresham lives with her husband Will in Somerville. They attend St. Philip the Apostle Catholic Church.

References
 State Senate Member page
 Campaign website

1942 births
Republican Party Tennessee state senators
University of the Incarnate Word alumni
Loyola University New Orleans alumni
George Washington University alumni
Republican Party members of the Tennessee House of Representatives
Living people
United States Marine Corps officers
Female United States Marine Corps personnel
Women state legislators in Tennessee
21st-century American politicians
21st-century American women politicians
American politicians of Mexican descent